Lily Lake is a lake that is somewhat rectangular and it has a small cove on its western side. It is contained within the Lily Lake Golf Resort, which is a private retirement golf community along US Highway 27. The Lily Lake community has a  surface area. 

This lake is man-made, possibly being dredged or excavated. It has part of the Resort community's nine-hole golf course along part of its shore. It also has some park benches and paved walking trails along its shore.

The community consists of 423 lot sites, most of which contain privately owned (manufactured) homes, although some are serviced lots for large RV's, also privately-owned. During daytime hours, the gate to Lily Lake Golf Resort is open, since the public is invited to golf, for a fee. The community is managed by the Lily Lake Property Owners Association, the governing body. The Lily Lake Golf Resort's official address is 6603 US Highway 27, Frostproof, FL 33843.

References

Lily